Hemeroblemma is a genus of moths in the family Erebidae. The genus was erected by Jacob Hübner in 1818.

Species
Hemeroblemma dolon (Cramer, 1777)
Hemeroblemma dolosa (Walker, 1858)
Hemeroblemma helima (Stoll [1782])
Hemeroblemma intracta Hübner [1823]
Hemeroblemma mexicana (Guenée, 1852)
Hemeroblemma opigena Drury, 1773

References

Thermesiini
Moth genera